Roberto Rafael Leopardi Laporta (born 19 July 1933) is a Uruguayan football midfielder who played for Uruguay in the 1954 FIFA World Cup. He also played for Club Nacional de Football.

References

External links
 FIFA profile

1933 births
Living people
Uruguayan footballers
Uruguay international footballers
Association football midfielders
Uruguayan Primera División players
Serie A players
Club Nacional de Football players
Peñarol players
Miramar Misiones players
Genoa C.F.C. players
1954 FIFA World Cup players
Copa América-winning players